A gua bao, also known as a pork belly bun, ambiguously as a bao, or erroneously as a bao bun, is a type of lotus leaf bun originating from Fujian cuisine. It is a popular snack in Taiwan and is commonly sold at night markets and restaurants. It is also a popular street food in Singapore, Malaysia, Philippines, and Nagasaki Chinatown in Japan.

It consists of a slice of stewed meat and condiments sandwiched between flat steamed bread known as lotus leaf bread. The lotus leaf bread is typically  in size, semi-circular and flat in form, with a horizontal fold that, when opened, gives the appearance that it has been sliced. The traditional filling for gua bao is a slice of red-cooked pork belly, typically dressed with stir-fried suan cai (pickled mustard greens), coriander, and ground peanuts.

Etymology 
Gua means to cut by drawing the knife around in the Taiwanese language. Bao means "bun", so the name bao bun is redundant, and bao in the Chinese language without any qualifiers is generally used to refer to baozi.

History

In Asia
The gua bao originated from the coastal regions of Fujian province in China. It is said to have come from either the cities of Quanzhou or Fuzhou. In Quanzhou, gua bao is known as rou jia bao or hu yao shi. The custom of Hui'an people in Quanzhou is to eat these pork belly buns to celebrate the marrying off of a daughter. In Jinjiang, a county of Quanzhou, there is a related vegetarian dish known as hu yao cao that replaces the pork with a solidified peanut paste and the lotus leaf bread with a bread that is baked in a clay oven similar to a tandoor.

In Taiwan, gua bao were reputed to be introduced to the island by Fuzhounese immigrants. Fuzhou rice vinasse meat is wrapped in it, and ingredients are chopped and soaked in meat gravy to eat. Gua bao was a food that merchants had on ritual festivals in Taiwan under Japanese rule. According to the research of Yu-Jen Chen, pork was expensive and not easy to get at that time, and flour was also lacking. As a result, it became a popular street food among the public until the 1970s. Gua bao nowadays has been a famous Taiwanese street snack food often offered with four-herbal soup sold at night markets.

In Singapore and Malaysia, the dish is popular among the Hokkien community, where it is known as kong bak pau.

In the Philippines, it is served in Chinese Filipino restaurants throughout the country, where it is more popularly known as cuapao.

In Hong Kong, they are known as cha bao which means "fork buns" as the sandwiches are usually pierced by a toothpick or bamboo skewer to keep the fillings in place.

In Japan they are called kakuni manju and are sold as a Chinese snack food. They are a specialty of Nagasaki Chinatown, having been sold in Japan for centuries due to the large number of Fuzhounese immigrants and historic relations between Fuzhou and Nagasaki represented by the construction of Sofukuji Temple. Recognizing the Fuzhounese community and historical connection, Nagasaki and Fuzhou established ties as sister cities in 1980.

In the West
Gua bao became popular in the early 2000s in the West through chef David Chang's Momofuku restaurants (c. 2004) although he says that he was unaware that the gua bao dish already existed. His Momofuku recipe was born out of a desire to use leftover pork from his ramen, and he was inspired by his dining experiences in Beijing and Manhattan Chinatown's Oriental Garden where the Peking duck was served on lotus leaf bread rather than the traditional spring pancake. He called his creation pork belly buns. The name "gua bao" was used and popularised by chef Eddie Huang when he opened his BaoHaus restaurant (c. 2009). Many other restaurants serving gua bao have opened up since then, but they often refer to the dish by the ambiguous name "bao" or the erroneous name "bao bun".

In the United States, New York City has a significant population of Fuzhounese Americans and gua bao is a popular dish sold at restaurants along with other iconic Fuzhounese dishes such as Fuzhou fish balls and lychee pork.

in the United Kingdom, Erchen Chang, Wai Ting and Shing Tat Chung opened BAO in London, further popularizing the snack in the West. Gua bao are often called hirata buns in the United Kingdom, named after Masashi Hirata, the executive chef of Ippudo in New York as many ramen restaurants began to adopt the practise of selling gua bao alongside their ramen dishes due to the influence of Momofuku and to meet high demand from customers who mistakenly believed they were a staple of ramen restaurants.

There have been many new trendy "gua bao" which incorporate pan-Asian fusion or non-Chinese fillings between the lotus leaf buns, such as kimchi or karaage. Although these are technically not gua bao at all as they do not include pork belly, and in China would only be considered different lotus leaf bun sandwiches (he ye bao).

See also
 List of sandwiches
 List of snack foods
 Taiwanese cuisine
 Night markets in Taiwan
 Hamburger
 Roujiamo, a similar food from Shaanxi Province

References

Fujian cuisine
Taiwanese pork dishes
Sandwiches